Niger competed at the 2019 African Games held from 19 to 31 August 2019 in Rabat, Morocco. In total, 43 athletes represented Niger in 10 sports and won two gold medals and one bronze medal. All medals were won in Taekwondo and the country finished 21st in the medal table.

Medal summary

Medal table 

|  style="text-align:left; width:78%; vertical-align:top;"|

|  style="text-align:left; width:22%; vertical-align:top;"|

3x3 basketball 

Niger competed in 3x3 basketball in both the men's tournament and women's tournament. Both the men's team and women's team lost all their matches.

Archery 

Ibrahim Hamzata Mahaman Salissou competed in the men's individual recurve event.

Adamou Saley was also scheduled to compete in the same event but he did not compete.

Athletics 

Aminatou Seyni competed in the women's 100 metres event and she reached the semifinals. She also finished in 4th place in the final of the women's 200 metres event.

Moussa Zaroumey competed in the men's 400 metres event and he finished in 29th place in the heats.

Mariama Mamoudou Ittatou competed in the women's 400 metres event and she finished in 20th place in the heats.

Boxing 

Sahabi Gado Moussa, Amadou Hassane Abdoul Madjid, Harouna Nomaou Maman Sani, Sahabi Gado Aboubacar and Kimba Issaka Abdoul Kader represented Niger in boxing.

Judo 

Six athletes represented Niger in judo.

Karate 

Issoufou Labo Adamou, Aboubacar A Tinni Amadou and Goumbi Kadade Mouniratou represented Niger in karate.

Swimming 

Seydou Lancina Alassane, Mouctar Mamoudou Albachir and Moussa Mahamane Roukaya competed in swimming.

Alassane competed in the men's 50 metre backstroke and men's 50 metre freestyle events.

Albachir competed in the men's 100 metre freestyle and men's 50 metre butterfly events.

Roukaya competed in the women's 50 metre freestyle and women's 100 metre freestyle events.

Taekwondo 

Niger competed in Taekwondo. Ismael Yacouba Garba won the gold medal in the men's -68 kg event.

Abdoul Razak Issoufou won the gold medal in the men's +87 kg event.

Tekiath Ben Yessouf won the bronze medal in the women's -57 kg event.

Table tennis 

Bello Fatimo was scheduled to compete in the men's singles event but he did not compete.

Volleyball 

Niger competed in the women's beach volleyball tournament and finished in 12th place.

References 

Nations at the 2019 African Games
2019
African Games